Iniistius bimaculatus, the two-spot razorfish, is a species of marine ray-finned fish from the family Labridae, the wrasses. It is found in the Indo-West Pacific, the Red Sea, the Persian Gulf, and off the coasts of India.  

References

bimaculatus
Taxa named by Eduard Rüppell
Fish described in 1829